These are lists of characters from the various Battlestar Galactica incarnations.

Original 1978 movie and series

People from the Galactica:
 Commander Adama - played by Lorne Greene
 Commander Cain - played by Lloyd Bridges
 Captain Apollo - played by Richard Hatch
 Lieutenant Starbuck - played by Dirk Benedict
 Lieutenant Boomer - played by Herbert Jefferson Jr.
 Lieutenant Athena - played by Maren Jensen
 Colonel Tigh - played by Terry Carter
 Serina - played by Jane Seymour
 Boxey - played by Noah Hathaway
 Muffit II (the robot daggit) - played by Evolution ("Evie") the chimpanzee
 Flight Sergeant Jolly - played by Tony Swartz
 Flight Officer Omega - played by David Greenan
 Flight Corporal Rigel - played by Sarah Rush
 Corporal Giles - played by Larry Manetti
 Ensign (later Flight Sergeant) Greenbean - played by Ed Begley, Jr.
 Dr. Salik - played by George Murdock
 Lieutenant Zac - played by Rick Springfield (pilot only) 
Dr. Paye - played by John Fink (pilot only) 
 Cassiopeia ("Socialator" in the pilot; then Medtech in the series) - played by Laurette Spang
 Lieutenant Sheba - played by Anne Lockhart
 Corporal Komma - played by Jeff MacKay
 Lieutenant Deitra - played by Sheila DeWindt
 Lieutenant Brie - played by Janet Louise Johnson
 Sorell - played by Janet Lynn Curtis
 Flight Sergeant Ortega - played by Frank Ashmore
 Lieutenant Barton - played by W. K. Stratton
 Dr. Wilker - played by John Dullaghan

Borellian Nomen - (survivors in the Colonial fleet: mentioned by Boomer to mostly keep to themselves)
 Maga - played by Lance LeGault
 Taba - played by Anthony De Longis
 Bora - played by Robert Feero

The Cylons and allies
 Baltar - played by John Colicos
 Imperious Leader - voiced by Patrick Macnee (uncredited)
 Lucifer, IL series Cylon - voiced by Jonathan Harris (uncredited)
 Specter, IL series Cylon - voiced by Murray Matheson (uncredited)

People from the "Ship of Light"
 John - played by Edward Mulhare
 Count Iblis - (revealed by unnamed voices on the Ship of Lights in the episode "War Of The Gods - Part 2" to be a dissident, who had abilities to manipulate and kill) played by Patrick Macnee

People from Terra
 Michael - played by Randolph Mantooth
 Sarah - played by Kelly Harmon
 Commandant Leiter - played by Lloyd Bochner

Galactica 1980 

People from the Galactica
 Commander Adama - played by Lorne Greene
 Lieutenant Starbuck - played by Dirk Benedict
 Colonel Boomer - played by Herb Jefferson, Jr.
 Captain Troy (adult Boxey, mentioned as such in several episodes) - played by Kent McCord
 Lieutenant Dillon - played by Barry Van Dyke
 Commander Xavier - played first by Richard Lynch and later by Jeremy Brett
 Colonel Jack Sydell - played by Allan Miller
 Doctor Zee - played first by Robbie Rist and later by James Patrick Stuart

People from Earth
 Jamie Hamilton - played by Robyn Douglass
 Dr. Donald Mortinson - played by Robert Reed
 Mr. Brooks - played by Fred Holliday
 Wolfman Jack - played by himself

Re-imagined 2003 miniseries / 2004 series

Characters of the re-imagined version of Battlestar Galactica, with pilot callsigns in parenthesis.

Key
 
 

Episode counts include the two part mini-series as well as the two television movies Razor and The Plan.

Main characters

Battlestar Pegasus military personnel 

 Helena Cain is the first commanding officer of the Pegasus. Following the destruction of the Colonies, Cain became unhinged, and committed numerous war crimes. She is shot dead by Gina Inviere, a Cylon Number Six whom she had tortured for months on end. Played by Michelle Forbes.
 Alastair Thorne is an officer aboard the Battlestar Pegasus known as the "Cylon Interregator", played by Fulvio Cecere. He appears in two episodes.
 Barry Garner is the third commanding officer of Pegasus. Before his promotion, he was the ship's chief engineer, played by John Heard. He appears in one episode and suffocates while fixing the Pegasus FTL drive.
 Cole "Stinger" Taylor is the CAG of the Battlestar Pegasus serving under Admiral Helena Cain. Played by John Pyper-Ferguson. He appears in two episodes.
 Gage is a Specialist serving on the Battlestar Pegasus, and later on Galactica, played by Mike Dopud. He appears in four episodes and serves in Gaeta's mutiny.
 Jurgen Belzen was the XO of the Pegasus. Portrayed as a long-time confidant of Adm. Helena Cain, he is nevertheless summarily executed by her for insubordination. Played by Steve Bacic.
 Jack Fisk was the Pegasus'  second-officer at the time of the attacks. A Lieutenant-Colonel, he is promoted to Colonel upon assuming Belzen's duties as XO, and later serves as interim CO of the Pegasus after the murder of Helena Cain before being murdered himself. Portrayed by Graham Beckel.
 Kendra Shaw is the executive officer on Pegasus under Lee Adama, played by Stephanie Jacobsen. She is the protagonist of the two-hour television movie Razor.
 Mel "Freaker" Firelli is an officer on Pegasus. Played by P.J. Prinsloo. He appears in two episodes.
 Noel Allison ("Narcho") is a senior Viper pilot on the Battlestar Pegasus who later transfers to Galactica, played by Sebastian Spence. He appears in nine episodes.
 Peter Laird is a civilian aeronautical engineer pressed into service on the Battlestar Pegasus by order of Admiral Helena Cain after the Cylon attack on the Twelve Colonies, played by Vincent Gale. He appears in six episodes and is killed by Tom Zarek during Gaeta's mutiny.
 Vireem is a Specialist serving on the Battlestar Pegasus and later on Galactica, played by Derek Delost. He appears in three episodes and serves in Gaeta's mutiny.

Other characters 

 
 Zak Adama is the younger son of William Adama, a Viper pilot killed in his first solo flight. Zak was portrayed by Clarke Hudson in the miniseries, while Tobias Mehler played Zak in four episodes of the main series.
 Hera Agathon is the first successful Human/Cylon natural born child. She is the daughter of Karl "Helo" Agathon and Sharon (Number 8) "Athena". Played in different episodes by child actors Lily Duong-Walton, Alexandra Thomas and Iliana Gomez-Martinez.
 Samuel Anders is a well-known athlete with the Caprica Buccaneers who forms a resistance group on Caprica with his teammates and later serves as a pilot in the colonial fleet. In the season 3 finale, he learns that he is a Final Five Cylon rather than a human. He later becomes Galacticas Hybrid. Played by Michael Trucco, Anders appears in 36 episodes.
 Tucker Clellan ("Duck")  is a Colonial Viper pilot aboard the Battlestar Galactica.  He was a central character in the 2006 web series "Battlestar Galactica: The Resistance", as well as appearing in the main series.  Becoming depressed after the death of his love, Nora, he joins the resistance on New Caprica and dies as a suicide bomber. Played by Christian Tessier, Duck appears in six webisodes and five episodes of the main series.
 Charlie Connor, a member of the resistance on New Caprica, later part of "The Circle" who secretly execute 13 collaborators from New Caprica.  Played by Ryan Robbins, Connor appears in seven episodes.
 "Crashdown" is a Raptor electronic countermeasures officer from the destroyed Battlestar Triton who joins the Galactica crew. A member of a three-Raptor survey party sent to examine the planet Kobol, Crashdown takes command of a small group when his Raptor is shot down; his inept and life-threatening leadership of the group ends when Dr. Baltar shoots him before Crashdown can shoot Cally.  Played by Sam Witwer, Crashdown appears in 11 episodes.
 Tory Foster is one of President Laura Roslin's chief aides and advisors. She is also one of the few who knows the whereabouts of the half-Cylon child, Hera Agathon. In the season 3 finale, she learns that she is a Final Five Cylon, rather than a human. Played by Rekha Sharma, Foster appears in 32 episodes.
 Louanne Katraine ("Kat") is a Colonial Viper pilot serving aboard Galactica. She was a former smuggler who took the identity of a dead girl, hoping to redeem herself following the attack. She and Starbuck become rivals, and the two frequently butt heads, developing a love-hate relationship. Following several near-death experiences, Kat becomes addicted to drugs she had been taking to deal with the stress, though she quits after nearly crashing her Viper while under the influence. She dies from severe radiation poisoning sustained while guiding several civilian ships out of a highly radioactive area. Played by Luciana Carro, Kat appeared in 18 episodes.
 Emily Kowalski is a terminal cancer patient befriended by Laura Roslin. Played by Nana Visitor, Kowalski appears in one episode.
 Romo Lampkin is a defense attorney, traveling on one of the civilian ships. He is called on, at different times, to defend Lee Adama and Gaius Baltar. Becomes President of the Twelve Colonies Of Kobol in the final episode, before the final survivors choose to scatter across the second Earth. Portrayed by Mark Sheppard, Lampkin appears in seven episodes.
 Maya is chosen as the adoptive human mother of Hera Agathon, though she is not told who the baby is. Played by Erica Cerra, Maya appears in four episodes.
 Daniel Novacek ("Bulldog") is a pilot who served under Commander William Adama aboard the Battlestar Valkyrie and was lost while on a stealth mission across the Armistice Line approximately six years before the Fall of the Twelve Colonies. Played by Carl Lumbly, Bulldog appears in one episode.
 Sue-Shaun is a member of Samuel Anders's resistance group on Caprica and a former Caprica Buccaneer. She is mercy-killed by Starbuck at her own request. Played by Tamara Lashley, Sue-Shaun appears in three episodes. 
 The First Hybrid is the precursor to the modern Cylon Hybrids, and is the first step in their evolution from pure machines to organic beings. Only appears in the two-hour television movie Razor, played by Campbell Lane.

Cylon-humanoids
Early in the series, the Colonials learn there are twelve models of Cylon-humanoids among them. The first of them were descendants of the lost thirteenth tribe called the "Final Five", who were not individually numbered and were not discovered until later in the series. The seven Cylon-humanoids first seen in the series are known as the "Significant Seven" and were numbered one to six, then jump to eight. The Number Seven model does not make an appearance, as his entire line had been destroyed prior to the start of the series. 
The "Significant Seven", with their model number
 John Cavil
 Leoben Conoy
 D'Anna Biers
 Simon O'Neill
 Aaron Doral
 "Caprica Six" (multiple identities)
 (Daniel - unseen, not one of the "Significant Seven")
 Lt. Boomer / Lt. Athena
The "Final Five"
 Samuel Anders
 Tory Foster
 Ellen Tigh
 Saul Tigh
 Galen Tyrol

Caprica 

 Adama family
 Joseph Adama (played by Esai Morales)
 Shannon Adama (played by Anna Galvin)
 Tamara Adama (played by Genevieve Buechner)
 William "Willie" Adama (played by Sina Najafi)
 Young Bill Adama (played by Markus Towfigh)
 Sam Adama (played by Sasha Roiz)
 Graystone family
 Amanda Graystone (played by Paula Malcomson)
 Daniel Graystone (played by Eric Stoltz)
 Zoe Graystone (played by Alessandra Torresani)
 Lacy Rand (played by Magda Apanowicz
 Sister Clarice Willow played by Polly Walker)
 Ruth (played by Karen Austin)
 Jordan Duram (played by Brian Markinson)
 Cyrus Xander (played by Hiro Kanagawa
 Evelyn played by Teryl Rothery)
 Pryah (played by Luciana Carro)
 Baxter Sarno (played by Patton Oswalt)
 Philomon (played by Alex Arsenault)
 Olaf Willow (played by Panou)
 Nestor Willow (played by Scott Porter)
 Ben Stark (played by Avan Jogia)
 Minister for Defence Val Chambers (played by William B. Davis)
 The Guatrau (played by Jorge Montesi)
 Caston (played by Katie Keating)
 Crew Member (played by Maggie Ma)
 Secretary of State for Defence Joan Leyte (played by Veena Sood)
 Barnabus Greele (played by James Marsters)
 Vesta (played by Camille Mitchell)
 Gara Singh (played by Peter Wingfield)

Blood & Chrome

List of characters for Battlestar Galactica: Blood and Chrome webseries/pilot movie

 Luke Pasqualino as Ensign/Lieutenant William "Husker" Adama
 Ben Cotton as Lieutenant Coker Fasjovik
 Lili Bordán as Dr. Becca Kelly
 John Pyper-Ferguson as Tech Sergeant Xander Toth; Pyper-Ferguson previously played recurring character Tomas Vergis on Caprica and Pegasus CAG Captain Taylor on Battlestar Galactica.
 Zak Santiago as Captain Armin "High Top" Diaz; Santiago previously played supporting character Pan on Caprica.
 Leo Li Chiang as Osirus Marine Sergeant
 Mike Dopud as Captain Deke "Minute Man" Tornvald; Dopud previously played supporting character Specialist Gage on Battlestar Galactica.
 Brian Markinson as Commander Silas Nash; Markinson played supporting character Jordan Duram on Caprica.
 Adrian Holmes as Lieutenant Decklan Elias
 Karen LeBlanc as Lieutenant Jenna
 Carmen Moore as Senior Lieutenant Nina Leotie; Moore played supporting character Fidelia Fazekas on Caprica.
 Toby Levins as Pilot "Sandman"
 Jill Teed as Commander Ozar; Teed portrayed the role of MSgt. Hadrian on Battlestar Galactica and supporting character Colonel Sasha Patel on Caprica.
 Sebastian Spence as Lieutenant Jim "Sunshine" Kirby; Spence played Capt. Noel "Narcho" Allison on Battlestar Galactica.
 Jordan Weller as Seamus Fahey
 Tom Stevens as Marine Baris
 Tricia Helfer as Cylon Prototype (voice); Helfer played the Cylon model Number Six in Battlestar Galactica.
 Ty Olsson as Osiris Crewmember; Olsson portrayed LSO Captain Aaron Kelly on Battlestar Galactica.

References

Battlestar Galactica
 
 
 
 
 Characters
Lists of science fiction television characters